Honoria Acosta-Sison (30 December 1888–19 January 1970) was the first Filipino woman to become a medical doctor.

Biography 
She was born in Calasiao, Pangasinan in the Philippines and graduated from the Women's Medical College of Pennsylvania in 1909. In 1910 she married the director of the Philippine General Hospital of Manila, where she first worked as assistant in obstetrics. She later was first assistant in obstetrics in St. Paul's Hospital in Manila, and in 1914 she became a faculty member at the University of the Philippines. By 1940 she was professor of obstetrics and gynecology and head of the department of obstetrics there.

She was known internationally for her research on trophoblastic diseases and pre-eclampsia in pregnancy.

Awards and honours

 Presidential Medal in 1955
 Gold Medal from the Women's Medical College of Pennsylvania in 1959
 Most Outstanding Woman Physician from the Philippine Women's Medical Association in 1959.
 In 1978, the Philippines issued a commemorative stamp with her name and likeness.

References

Further reading

1888 births
1970 deaths
Filipino obstetricians and gynaecologists
20th-century Filipino medical doctors
Filipino women medical doctors
20th-century women physicians
Woman's Medical College of Pennsylvania alumni